{{Infobox Christian leader
| type = Cardinal
| honorific-prefix = His Eminence
| name             = Jozef De Kesel
| honorific-suffix = 
| title            = Cardinal, Archbishop of Mechelen-Brussels  Primate of Belgium
| image            = Monseigneur De Kesel à la basilique Saint-Martin de Liège.jpg
| image_size       = 
| alt              = 
| caption          =
| church           = Roman Catholic Church
| archdiocese      = Mechelen-Brussels
| province         = 
| metropolis       = 
| diocese          = 
| see              = 
| appointed        = 6 November 2015
| term_start       = 12 December 2015
| term_end         =
| quashed          = 
| predecessor      = André-Joseph Léonard
| successor        = 
| opposed          = 
| other_post       = Cardinal-Priest of Ss. Giovanni e Paolo
| previous_post    = 

| ordination       = 26 August 1972
| ordained_by      = Leo-Karel Jozef De Kesel
| consecration     = 26 May 2002
| consecrated_by   = Godfried Danneels
| cardinal = 19 November 2016
| created_cardinal_by = Pope Francis
|  rank = Cardinal-Priest

| birth_name       = 
| birth_date       = 
| birth_place      = Ghent, Belgium
| death_date       = 
| death_place      = 
| buried           = 
| resting_place_coordinates = 
| nationality      = 
| religion         = 
| residence        = 
| parents          = 
| spouse           = 
| children         = 
| occupation       = 
| profession       = 
| education        =
| alma_mater       = Catholic University of Leuven  Pontifical Gregorian University
| motto            = "Vobiscum Christianus"(With you, I am a Christian)
| signature        = 
| signature_alt    = 
| coat_of_arms     = Coat of arms of Jozef De Kesel.svg
| coat_of_arms_alt = 
}}

 
Jozef De Kesel (born 17 June 1947) is a Belgian prelate of the Catholic Church who has been a cardinal since 2016 and Archbishop of Mechelen-Brussels since 2015. He served as Bishop of Bruges from 2010 to 2015.

 Early life 

De Kesel was born in 1947 in Ghent. He entered the seminary in 1965, studied philosophy and theology at the seminary of Saint-Paul in Ghent and received his degree in Philosophy and Letters at the Catholic University of Leuven. From 1968 until 1972 he studied theology in Rome at the Pontifical Gregorian University, he gained first his license and then in 1977 his doctorate.

He was ordained a priest for the Diocese of Ghent on 26 August 1972 by his uncle Leo, who served as auxiliary bishop of Ghent. While in Ghent he taught Religious Education at the diocesan secondary school in Eeklo (1974–1980), and provided courses in Religion, Philosophical Anthropology and Contemporary Thought at a training college for social work (1977–1980), before becoming professor of fundamental theology and dogmatic theology at the Major Seminary of Ghent (1980–1996) and at the same time, Professor of Theology at the Higher Institute of Religious Sciences in Ghent, where he was also Dean, professor of Christology at the Catholic University of Leuven (1989–1992), responsible for the formation of pastoral workers in Ghent (1983–2002), episcopal vicar for theological and pastoral training in the diocese of Ghent (1992–2002).

 Bishop 
Pope John Paul II appointed him titular Bishop of Bulna and auxiliary of Mechelen-Brussel on 20 March 2002. He was consecrated on 26 May and appointed Vicar General for the vicariate of Brussels. In the Belgian bishops' conference he has been responsible for the inter-diocesan Commission for Pastoral Liturgy (Flemish and French) and a delegate to the Commission of the Bishops' Conferences of the European Community (COMECE).

After Cardinal Godfried Danneels, Archbishop of Mechelen-Brussels, reached retirement age in 2008, the Nuncio to Belgium, Archbishop Karl-Josef Rauber, recommended De Kesel to succeed him, a candidacy supported by Danneels as well. Pope Benedict XVI ignored Rauber's recommendation and De Kesel remained an auxiliary. The affair was recalled in later years as Pope Francis took a different stance, making Rauber a cardinal, moving De Kesel, and then making De Kesel a cardinal.

On 25 June 2010, he was appointed bishop of Bruges after the early resignation of Roger Vangheluwe and installed there on 10 July 2010.

In September 2010 De Kesel said: "I think the Church must ask itself the question of whether it is appropriate to keep the mandatory character of celibacy. We could say that there are celibate priests, but that people for whom celibacy is humanly impossible should also have the chance of becoming priests."

 Archbishop 
On 6 November 2015 Pope Francis named De Kesel to succeed André-Joseph Léonard as Archbishop of Mechelen-Brussels and Primate of Belgium. He was installed at a Mass attended by the Belgian monarch on 12 December 2015.

Carl E. Olson of the Catholic World Report'' regards De Kesel as a theological liberal, noting his support of Cardinal Walter Kasper's proposal to allow couples who have divorced and remarried to receive Holy Communion. Christopher Lamb calls him "a moderate in comparison with his conservative predecessor". He noted that the Bishop of Antwerp, Johan Bonny, had called for the recognition of same-sex relationships, while De Kesel by contrast said that universal respect, no matter one's sexual orientation, "is a value that the Gospel shares with modern culture."

Pope Francis made De Kesel a cardinal in the consistory of 19 November 2016.

On 23 December 2017 Pope Francis appointed De Kesel a member of the Dicastery for the Laity, Family and Life. He was named a member of the Pontifical Council for Culture on 11 November 2019.

In 2022, together with other bishops of Flanders, he publishes a document on the blessing of homosexual unions, underlining however that this blessing is not to be understood as a different form of marriage that remains a sacrament reserved for the union between man and woman. This provision was made despite the Responsum published by the Congregation for the Doctrine of the Faith in 2021 and approved by the pope in which it is declared that it is not possible to bless that type of unions.

Ordinations 
 Lode Aerts; bishop of Bruges
 Lode Van Hecke; bishop of Ghent

References

External links

 
 

1947 births
Living people
Clergy from Ghent
Bishops of Bruges
21st-century Roman Catholic archbishops in Belgium
Pontifical Gregorian University alumni
Belgian cardinals
Cardinals created by Pope Francis
Belgian Roman Catholic archbishops